Alex Smith (born November 6, 1986, Fort Wayne, Indiana) is an American entrepreneur. He is the co-founder & CEO of 3BG Supply Co., an industrial distributor.

He is also the co-founder of A Better Fort, and co-founder of BAALS Music Festival.

Biography 
Alex Smith was born in Fort Wayne, Indiana where he attended Bishop Dwenger High School. Following high school, Smith enrolled in Indiana University where he graduated with a bachelor's degree in Public Financial Management prior to working  as a financial planner at Galecki Financial Management. Smith left financial services and co-founded 3BG Supply Co. In 2014, the company was awarded Emerging Company of the Year and overall Innovators of the Year by Fort Wayne Business Weekly.

Projects

The MY CITY Project (HipHop4theCity)
In 2012, Smith facilitated a music project entitled,"HipHop4theCity" (aka The MY CITY Project). It was a community driven hip-hop project that involved the collaboration of many local musicians and most notably American rapper, Nyzzy Nyce. This project showcased the region's undiscovered talent while simultaneously bringing awareness to community involvement, the arts, and what young people are able to do for a community's civic pride when they collaborate and work together. Coverage of the project sparked a newly renewed sense of civic pride within the young population of Fort Wayne that attracted the attention of national economic development publications and blogs and inspired other civic initiatives such as the annual MY CITY Summit.

Personal life

Smith is married to Michaela Smith.

References 

1986 births
Living people
Philanthropists from Indiana
American chief executives
Businesspeople from Indiana
Fort Wayne, Indiana, People from
People from Allen County, Indiana